TV 21 is a television channel in North Macedonia. Initial investment was 6.5 million euros and it has around 100 employees.

See also
 Television in North Macedonia

References

Television channels in North Macedonia